Striped Hill is a small ice-free hill, 90 m, standing near the south shore of Trinity Peninsula, 1 nautical mile (1.9 km) east-northeast of Church Point. Charted and named by the Falkland Islands Dependencies Survey (FIDS), 1946. The descriptive name is derived from the stratifications on a small cliff on the seaward side of the hill.

Hills of Trinity Peninsula